USS Bunting may refer to the following ships of the United States Navy:

  a wooden-hulled purse seiner built in 1935 at Tacoma, Washington.

References 
 

United States Navy ship names